The 2008 Tour of the Basque Country, the 65th edition of the Tour of the Basque Country stage cycling race, took place from 7 April to 12 April 2008.

Stages

Stage 1
7 April 2008 - Legazpi to Legazpi,

Stage 2
8 April 2008 - Legazpi to Erandio,

Stage 3
9 April 2008 - Erandio to Viana,

Stage 4
10 April 2008 - Viana to Vitoria-Gasteiz,

Stage 5
11 April 2008 - Vitoria-Gasteiz to Orio,

Stage 6
12 April 2008 - Orio to Orio,  (ITT)

General classification

Jersey progress

In stage 2, Ezequiel Mosquera wore the points jersey.

Individual 2008 UCI ProTour standings after race
As of 13 April 2008, after the 2008 Tour of the Basque Country.

References

External links

2008
Bas
Bas